Bandundu may refer to:
 Bandundu (city), a city in the DRC
 Bandundu Province, a former province of the DRC